Lawrence H. Fountain (April 23, 1913 – October 10, 2002) was a Democratic U.S. representative from North Carolina from 1953 to 1983.

Early life
Fountain was educated in the public schools of Edgecombe County and at the University of North Carolina at Chapel Hill where he received his A. B. degree in 1934 and his Juris Doctor degree. He was admitted to the North Carolina Bar following graduation from law school in 1936.

He practiced law in Tarboro, North Carolina and was active in statewide Democratic Party politics until March 1942 when he entered the United States Army as a private in the infantry. He rose through the ranks and was released from service as a major in the Judge Advocate General's Office on March 4, 1946. Fountain then returned to his law practice in Tarboro.
In civilian life, he remained a member of the U. S. Army Reserve and later retired as a lieutenant colonel.

Service in public office
In 1947, Fountain was elected to the North Carolina Senate where he served until 1952 when he was elected to the 83rd Congress as Representative from the Second Congressional District of North Carolina. He was reelected to each Congress through the 97th, at which time he did not seek reelection. He was a signatory to the 1956 Southern Manifesto that opposed the desegregation of public schools ordered by the Supreme Court in Brown v. Board of Education. As the price for his vote for legislation supporting the War on Poverty, he demanded the firing of deputy director Adam Yarmolinsky, who, while with the Defense Department, had helped force integration of public places near military bases in North Carolina.

Fountain was appointed by President Lyndon B. Johnson as a United States Delegate to the 22nd Session in 1967 of the United Nations General Assembly. In this capacity, he served as assistant to United States Ambassador Arthur J. Goldberg during the Security Council debate following the June 6th Arab–Israeli Six-Day War.

He led the fight in 1978 for the creation of the first independent Presidentially-appointed inspector general ("watchdog") in the former Department of Health, Education and Welfare, and worked for the establishment of inspectors general in every key Federal department and agency. Each inspector general plays a significant role in curbing waste, fraud, abuse, and mismanagement in government.

From time to time, he served on various subcommittees of both the Committee on Government Operations and the Committee on Foreign Affairs. For 14 years, Fountain was chairman of the House Foreign Affairs Subcommittee on Near Eastern Affairs. For 28 years he was chairman of the House Government Operations Subcommittee on Intergovernmental Relations. He conducted hundreds of investigations into food and drug safety, and led the effort to create inspectors general in federal departments and agencies.

From 1981 to 1982, he was a member of the Presidential Advisory Committee on Federalism. The committee had the responsibility of advising the President on ways to restore proper relationships between federal, state and local governments.

Personal life
Fountain was a Presbyterian Elder and had a perfect Sunday School attendance record for more than eighty years. He served as a trustee of the National Presbyterian Church from 1961 to 1964 and again from 1977 to 1980. He was a member of the Executive Committee of the East Carolina Council of the Boy Scouts of America, and was a member of the local and other Bar Associations, the Elks, and Kiwanis Club. He served as lieutenant governor of the Sixth Division of the Carolinas District of Kiwanis International. He was also a Jaycee and received the Distinguished Service Award (Man of the Year) of the Tarboro Jaycees in 1948.

A lifelong advocate of education, Fountain was a charter member of the Board of Trustees of St. Andrews Presbyterian College of Laurinburg  from 1955 through 1971. He was reelected to the board in 1972 and served until 1974.

Awards
North Carolina Citizens Association Distinguished Public Service Award (1971)
 University of North Carolina School of Medicine Distinguished Service Award (1973)
 Association of American University Presses Distinguished Service to Higher Education and the Scholarly Community Award (1975)
National League of Cities Special Citation for Distinguished Congressional Service (1976)
 Association of Federal Investigators Leadership and Distinguished Service Award (1978).
 In 1982, the North Carolina League of Municipalities, meeting in Annual Convention, passed a resolution of deep appreciation and commendation to Fountain for "continued efforts to assist local governments…throughout the nation"
 Also in 1982, the Association of Federal Investigators honored Congressman Fountain for the second time in five years with an award for "unstinting support for law enforcement and investigation, and for his outstanding career in public service to the American people."

Memorials
"Congressman L.H. Fountain Highway," a section of U.S. 64 which runs through Edgecombe County, was named in his memory.

References

L. H. Fountain Papers, Southern Historical Collection, University of North Carolina Library, Chapel Hill, North Carolina.
Biographical Directory of the United States Congress, 1774-Present

1913 births
2002 deaths
20th-century American politicians
People from Edgecombe County, North Carolina
American Presbyterians
American segregationists
Democratic Party North Carolina state senators
Democratic Party members of the United States House of Representatives from North Carolina
United States Army personnel of World War II
United States Army officers